Spontaneous bacterial peritonitis (SBP) is the development of a bacterial infection in the peritoneum,  despite the absence of an obvious source for the infection. It is specifically an infection of the ascitic fluid – an increased volume of peritoneal fluid. Ascites is most commonly a complication of cirrhosis of the liver. It can also occur in patients with nephrotic syndrome. SBP has a high mortality rate.

The diagnosis of SBP requires paracentesis, a sampling of the peritoneal fluid  taken from the peritoneal cavity. If the fluid contains large numbers of white blood cells known as neutrophils (>250 cells/µL), infection is confirmed and antibiotics will be given, without waiting for culture results. In addition to antibiotics, infusions of albumin are usually administered.

Other life-threatening complications such as kidney malfunction and increased liver insufficiency can be triggered by spontaneous bacterial peritonitis. 30% of SBP patients develop kidney malfunction, one of the strongest predictors for mortality. Where there are signs of this development albumin infusion will also be given.

Spontaneous fungal peritonitis (SFP) can also occur and this can sometimes accompany a bacterial infection.

Signs and symptoms
Signs and symptoms of spontaneous bacterial peritonitis (SBP) include fevers, chills, nausea, vomiting, abdominal pain and tenderness, general malaise, altered mental status, and worsening ascites. Thirteen percent of patients have no signs or symptoms. In cases of acute or chronic liver failure SBP is one of the main triggers for hepatic encephalopathy, and where there is no other clear causal indication for this, SBP may be suspected.

These symptoms can also be the same for a spontaneous fungal peritonitis (SFP) and therefore make a differentiation difficult. Delay of diagnosis can delay antifungal treatment and lead to a higher mortality rate.

Causes
SBP is most commonly caused by Gram-negative E. coli, followed by Klebsiella. Common Gram-positive bacteria identified include species of Streptococcus, Staphylococcus, and Enterococcus. The percentage of gram-positive bacteria responsible has been increasing.

A spontaneous fungal infection can often follow a spontaneous bacterial infection that has been treated with antibiotics. The use of antibiotics can result in an excessive growth of fungi in the gut flora which can then translocate into the peritoneal cavity. Although fungi are much larger than bacteria, the increased intestinal permeability resulting from advanced cirrhosis makes their translocation easier. SFP is mostly caused by species of Candida and most commonly by Candida albicans.

Pathophysiology 

H2 antagonists and proton-pump inhibitors are medications that decrease or suppress the secretion of acid by the stomach. Their use in treating cirrhosis is associated with the development of SBP. Bacterial translocation is thought to be the key mechanism for the development of SBP. Small intestinal bacterial overgrowth which may be implicated in this translocation, is found in a large percentage of those with cirrhosis.
With respect to compromised host defenses, patients with severe acute or chronic liver disease are often deficient in complement and may also have malfunctioning of the neutrophilic and reticuloendothelial systems.

As for the significance of ascitic fluid proteins, it was demonstrated that cirrhotic patients with ascitic protein concentrations below 1 g/dL were 10 times more likely to develop SBP than individuals with higher concentrations.  It is thought that the antibacterial, or opsonic, activity of ascitic fluid is closely correlated with the protein concentration. Additional studies have confirmed the validity of the ascitic fluid protein concentration as the best predictor of the first episode of SBP.

In nephrotic syndrome, SBP can frequently affect children but only very rarely can it affect adults.

Diagnosis
Infection of the peritoneum causes an inflammatory reaction with a subsequent increase in the number of neutrophils in the fluid. Diagnosis is made by paracentesis (needle aspiration of the ascitic fluid); SBP is diagnosed if the fluid contains neutrophils at greater than 250 cells per mm3 (equals a cell count of 250 x106/L) fluid in the absence of another reason for this (such as inflammation of one of the internal organs or a perforation).

The fluid is also cultured to identify bacteria. If the sample is sent in a plain sterile container, 40% of samples will identify an organism, while if the sample is sent in a bottle with culture medium, the sensitivity increases to 72–90%.

Prevention
All people with cirrhosis might benefit from antibiotics (oral fluoroquinolone norfloxacin) if:
 Ascitic fluid protein <1.0 g/dL. Patients with fluid protein <15 g/L and either Child-Pugh score of at least 9 or impaired renal function may also benefit.
 Previous SBP

People with cirrhosis admitted to the hospital should receive prophylactic antibiotics if:
 They have bleeding esophageal varices

Studies on the use of rifaximin in cirrhotic patients, have suggested that its use may be effective in preventing spontaneous bacterial peritonitis.

Treatment

Antibiotics
Although there is no high-quality evidence, the third-generation cephalosporins are considered the standard empirical treatment for spontaneous bacterial peritonitis in people with cirrhosis.

In  practice, cefotaxime is the agent of choice for treatment of SBP. After confirmation of SBP, hospital admission is usually advised for observation and intravenous antibiotic therapy.

Where there is a risk of kidney malfunction developing in a syndrome called hepatorenal syndrome, intravenous albumin is usually administered too. Paracentesis may be repeated after 48 hours to ensure control of infection. After recovery from a single episode of SBP, indefinite prophylactic antibiotics are recommended.

Prokinetics
The addition of a prokinetic drug to an antibiotic regimen reduces the incidence of spontaneous bacterial peritonitis possibly via decreasing small intestinal bacterial overgrowth.

Intravenous albumin
A randomized controlled trial found that intravenous albumin on the day of admission and on hospital day 3 can reduce kidney impairment.

Epidemiology 
Patients with ascites underwent routine paracentesis; the incidence of active SBP ranged from 10% to 27% at the time of hospital admission.

History
SBP was first described in 1964 by Harold O. Conn.

References

External links 

Peritoneum disorders